The 1885 Nepal coup d'état was a coup d'état led by Khadga Shumsher, Bhim Shumsher, Bir Shumsher, and Dambar Shumsher on 22 November 1885.

References 

1880s in Nepal
Coups in Nepal
Rana dynasty